Beasley Run is a stream in the U.S. state of Ohio.

Beasley Run bears the name of an early settler.

See also
List of rivers of Ohio

References

Rivers of Preble County, Ohio
Rivers of Ohio